Kääpa Landscape Conservation Area is a nature park situated in Tartu County, Estonia.

Its area is 2296 ha.

The protected area was designated in 1968 after reorganizing Tammeluha Protected Area. In 2005, the protected area was redesigned to the landscape conservation area.

References

Nature reserves in Estonia
Geography of Tartu County